"Yo Le Llego" (stylized in upper case; English: "I'll Be There") is a song by Colombian singer J Balvin and Puerto Rican rapper Bad Bunny from their collaborative album Oasis. The song was released on 9 August 2019 as the third single from the project.

Chart performance  
Like the rest of the songs of Oasis, "Yo Le Llego" managed to chart on the Billboard Hot Latin Songs chart, peaking at number 18.

Music video  
The music video for "Yo Le Llego" was released on 9 August 2019 and was directed by Colin Tilley. It was filmed in Old San Juan, Puerto Rico.

Charts

Certifications

References 

2019 singles
2019 songs
J Balvin songs
Bad Bunny songs
Spanish-language songs
Music videos directed by Colin Tilley
Songs written by J Balvin
Songs written by Bad Bunny
Song recordings produced by Tainy